"I Can Still Feel You" is a song written by Kim Tribble and Tammy Hyler, and recorded by American country music singer Collin Raye that reached the top of the Billboard Hot Country Songs chart.  It was released in April 1998 as the first single from his album The Walls Came Down.

Background
"I Can Still Feel You" is in cut time and the key of E major. Raye's vocals range from E4 to B5.

Critical reception
Chuck Taylor, of Billboard magazine reviewed the song favorably saying it boasts a "strong lyric, a memorable melody, and an outstanding vocal performance".

Music video
The music video was directed by Steven Goldmann and premiered in early 1998. It was shot in black and white, and showed Raye with his leather jacket on as he walks across the streets singing the song. It also uses different lighting and moving effects throughout the video.

Chart performance
This song debuted at number 52 on the U.S. Billboard Hot Country Singles & Tracks chart dated April 25, 1998. It spent 26 weeks on that chart, and peaked at number one on the chart dated July 18, 1998, where it remained for two weeks. The song was Raye's fourth and final number one on this chart

Year-end charts

References

1998 singles
1998 songs
Collin Raye songs
Song recordings produced by Paul Worley
Song recordings produced by Billy Joe Walker Jr.
Epic Records singles
Music videos directed by Steven Goldmann
Songs written by Tammy Hyler
Songs written by Kim Tribble